Roda is a river of Thuringia, Germany and it flows into the Saale in Jena-Lobeda.

See also
List of rivers of Thuringia

Rivers of Thuringia
Rivers of Germany